Cain Ginyilitshe Ndabazekhaya Mathema (born 25 January 1947) is a Zimbabwean politician and writer. He has held various cabinet roles in the Zimbabwean government. He is a member of Zanu-PF. He was born in Sipepa, Tsholotsho District.

Political career
Cain Mathema joined the Zimbabwe People's Revolutionary Army (ZIPRA) in 1968.

Soon after independence, Cain Mathema worked as a senior civil servant in the government of Zimbabwe. He later contested for political office and has since served as a governor and cabinet minister.

In Robert Mugabe's government, Mathema served as:

 Deputy Minister of Rural Resources and Water Development - 1997  
 Ambassador to Zambia  
 Governor for Bulawayo - February 2004 - September 2013 
 Minister of State for Provincial Affairs, Matebeleland North - September 2013 - October 2017 
 Minister of War Veteran - October 2017 - November 2017

In Emmerson Mnangagwa's government, Mathema has served as:

 Minister of State for Matabeleland North - December 2017 - September 2018 
 Minister of Home Affairs and Cultural Heritage - September 2018 - November 2019
 Minister of Primary and Secondary Education - November 2019 – 30 September 2021

Since 2005, he has been placed on the United States sanctions list.

In late February 2008, he was present at rally supporting ZANU-PF candidate Sikhanyiso Ndlovu's bid for the Pelandaba-Mpopoma constituency seat.

On 6 November 2018, he promised to crush anti-government demonstrations which he alleges were being planned by Nelson Chamisa.

Personal life
Cain Mathema is a published Ndebele and English poet, playwright, short story writer and cartoonist. He has published over 20 books on all sorts of topics. His books are published by different publishing houses which include but are not limited to, Mambo Press, Longman Press, Mathema Publishers, College Press and the University of Zimbabwe amongst others. His works have been used in local universities and beyond.

In December 2016, Cain who was then Matebeleland North Provincial Governor, married 23-year-old Bathabetsoe Nare who was 47 years his junior.

References

Provincial governors of Zimbabwe
Living people
1947 births
ZANU–PF politicians